Abba Seafood AB, formerly Abba AB, with head offices in Gothenburg, Sweden, is a company producing preserved fish products. The main factory is located in Kungshamn.

The company was established in Bergen 1838 and in the 1850s it moved to Stockholm. The name AB Bröderna Ameln, ABBA, was registered in 1906. In 1981, it was merged into Volvo, was sold to Procordia and is since 1995 a part of the Norwegian Orkla ASA. Abba has also acquired competitors such as Bohusräkor AB, Glyngöre and Limfjordskompaniet. In 2005, Abba acquired AB Hållöfisk, which has been involved in the processing of shrimp and crayfish since 1946. Production sites were previously located in Rösholmen and Uddevalla. In 2013, Abba Seafood was acquired by Orkla Foods Sverige AB.

Some of the company's best-known products include the fish roe paste Kalles kaviar and Abba pickled herring.

The Swedish pop group ABBA are not connected to the company, but in 1974 the group's manager contacted Abba AB to confirm that there would not be any issues around them using the same name.

See also
 List of seafood companies

References

External links
https://www.abba.se/ Official website]

ABBA
Manufacturing companies established in 1838
Food and drink companies established in 1838
Manufacturing companies based in Gothenburg
Purveyors to the Court of Sweden
Norwegian companies established in 1838
Seafood companies of Europe
Food and drink companies of Sweden